The Ferrari 246 F1-66 (also known as 158/246 and 246T) was a racing car used by Scuderia Ferrari and Reg Parnell Racing during the 1966 Formula One season.

Development
At the end of the 1965 Formula One season, a Ferrari 158 chassis was fitted with a 2.4-litre (2404.74 cc) Dino V6 engine, updated with fuel-injection, in order to take part in the 1966 Tasman Series. However, intended driver John Surtees was still recovering from injuries sustained in an accident in a Can-Am race at Mosport Park, and the Tasman entry was withdrawn. The car was then used as the second team car for the start of the 1966 Formula One season, alongside the new Ferrari 312.

Racing history
Lorenzo Bandini used the 246T for the first two races in 1966. His best result was second place and fastest lap at the 1966 Monaco Grand Prix, followed by third place in Belgium. The car was then put aside until the German Grand Prix, where it was a third team entry driven by Ludovico Scarfiotti. Scarfiotti out-qualified his teammates in their more powerful 3-litre cars, but retired with electrical problems. The final outing for the 246T was the 1966 Italian Grand Prix, lent by Ferrari to Reg Parnell Racing and driven by Giancarlo Baghetti. Baghetti was running as high as fifth until he had problems with his throttle linkage and eventually finished last, nine laps in arrears.

Complete Formula One World Championship results
(key) (Races in italics indicate fastest lap)

* Only 6 points which counted towards Ferrari's Championship total were scored using the 246; the remaining points were scored using the 312.

Non-Championship Formula One results
(key) (results in bold indicate pole position; results in italics indicate fastest lap)

References

1966 Formula One season cars
246 F1-66
Rear mid-engine, rear-wheel-drive vehicles